The JAC Binyue (宾悦) or JAC J7 is a mid-size car produced by JAC Motors of China.

Overview
The exterior design is controversial as the rear end of the Binyue is heavily inspired by the Merecedes-Benz C-class W203. Originally launched as the JAC Binyue C20 with prices ranging from 88,800 yuan to 149,700 yuan, a facelift version was revealed in 2011 called the JAC Binyue C18 and was powered by a A new 1.8L engine replacing the old 2.0L engine.  Original plans for the pricing after the facelift was from 95,900 yuan to 139,800 yuan, but the final prices after the facelift was from 91,800 yuan to 132,800 yuan.

JAC HFC7200CL 
A prototype based on the JAC Binyue code named the JAC HFC7200CL was revealed after the initial launch of the Binyue featuring a restyled front fascia. Plans of the production JAC HFC7200CL was revealed as of October 2011, but the car remains a prototype.

References

External links

 (JAC)

J7
Cars introduced in 2008
Executive cars
Front-wheel-drive vehicles
Mid-size cars